Marija Jovanović (born 31 March 1995) is a Serbian handball player for ÍBV and the Serbian national team.

She represented Serbia at the 2021 World Women's Handball Championship.

References

External links

Serbian female handball players
1995 births
Living people
People from Belgrade
Expatriate handball players